Viktor Mikhailovich Sukhodrev (12 December 1932 – 16 May 2014) was a Soviet and Russian diplomat and translator, known for being a personal interpreter for Soviet leaders Nikita Khrushchev, Leonid Brezhnev and Mikhail Gorbachev, as well as high-ranking Soviet politicians including Alexei Kosygin, Andrei Gromyko, Anastas Mikoyan, and Frol Kozlov.

Early life and education
Sukhodrev was born into the family of a Soviet intelligence officer who worked in the United States. As a young boy during World War II, Sukhodrev spent six years in London with his mother, who worked at the Soviet trade mission. He attended the Soviet Embassy School in London beginning at age 8. He returned to Moscow at the age of twelve and later graduated from the Military Institute of Foreign Languages.

Career
In 1956, Sukhodrev began his career in the translation bureau of the Ministry of Foreign Affairs (MFA). Sukhodrev translated Nikita Khrushchev's famous quote "We will bury you", among others. In the 1980s, Sukhodrev was the deputy head of the Department for the United States and Canada at the Soviet MFA. In 1999, he penned the memoir book Yazyk moy – drug moy (My Tongue is My Friend).

During a career of nearly thirty years, Sukhodrev was present at numerous high-profile summits and deal-makings. Richard Nixon called Sukhodrev "a superb linguist who spoke English as well as he did Russian", while Henry Kissinger called him "unflappable" and a "splendid interpreter". According to the International Herald Tribune, "Sukhodrev was present but not present, emptying himself of ego, slipping into the skin of the man who was speaking, feeling his feelings, saying his words".

Soviet and U.S. officials alike considered him to be the best interpreter in the world between Russian and English and he would sometimes be the only interpreter at bilateral meetings. He had a very good understanding of idiomatic expressions in English with a firm grasp of the varied nuances of meaning in different parts of the English-speaking world. His memory was prodigious: he only required a few notes to be able to deliver a perfect translation of a 20-minute speech. In 2012, Sukhodrev received the Russian national prize Translator of the Year.

Personal life
Sukhodrev was married twice. His first wife was actress Inna Kmit, with whom he had a son, Sergei. His second wife was Inga Okunevskaya, a professor of English, who predeceased him. Sukhodrev died in Moscow on 16 May 2014 at the age of 81.

References

1932 births
2014 deaths
20th-century Russian translators
21st-century Russian translators
Diplomats from Kaunas
Recipients of the Order of the Red Banner of Labour
English–Russian translators
Russian–English translators
Interpreters
Russian diplomats
Russian translators
Soviet diplomats
Soviet translators